A cascade impactor measures the reach range of a particulate substance as it moves through an opening with the use of aerosol.  Cascade impactors are strictly measurement-related devices. In addition to measuring the range of substances moved through an opening by aerosol, the impactor can also be used to determine the particle size of the distributed substance. A cascade impactor collects its samples in a graduated manner. This allows the user to identify the sizes of the substance particles as the particles are distributed from the propellant aerosol source. When the aerosol substance is distributed into the cascade impactor, the substance enters a series of discs designed to collect solids and different particulate matter. The substance is thus collected as it passes through the disc series. Each disc is set in sequence with both the prior and the previous disc. The size of the discs is graduated as well, to properly determine the size of the particulate matter at each stage of the impactor.

An impactor is a device that classifies particles present in a sample of air or gas into known size ranges. It does this by drawing the air sample through a cascade of progressively finer nozzles. The air jets from these nozzles impact on plane sampling surfaces and each stage collects finer particles than its predecessor. The samples may be analysed under the microscope or by any method of chemical analysis that may be suitable for obtaining the mass of material of interest on each stage, e.g. atomic absorption or gas chromatography-mass spectrometry (GC/MS).

All cascade impactors have certain design features in common. By using suitable pumps, jet dimensions can be decreased to the point where the velocity is close to that of sound, enabling particles down to about 0.25 µm to be impacted.

See also 
Aerosol impaction

External links
A multi-stage, low flow rate cascade impactor Journal of Aerosol Science, 1970
Good Cascade Impactor Practice (GCIP) and Considerations for “In-Use” Specifications Journal of the American Association of Pharmaceutical Scientists, 2013
A Novel Size-Selective Airborne Particle Size Fractionating Instrument for Health Risk Evaluation Journal The Annals of Occupational Hygiene, 2009

Measuring instruments
Aerosol measurement